No Place for Love is a 1947 German comedy film directed by Hans Deppe and starring Bruni Löbel, Heinz Lausch and Ernst Legal. It was made in the Soviet Sector of Berlin by the state-controlled DEFA company. It is part of the post-war tradition of rubble films. Its plot revolves around the shortage of housing in the bombed-out city. It was shot at the Johannisthal Studios and on location around the city. The film's sets were designed by the art director Otto Erdmann and Kurt Herlth.

Synopsis
While on leave in Berlin during the Second World War, a soldier named Hans meets a young woman named Monika. They fall in love and make plans for a future together after the war. Yet their later attempts to find an apartment and get married are hindered by the housing shortage and they have to stay separately with relatives.

Cast
 Bruni Löbel as Monika
 Heinz Lausch as Hans Winkelmann
 Ernst Legal as William Spier
 Elsa Wagner as Niobe
 Margarete Kupfer as Frau Kruse
 Hans Neie as Peter
 Wilhelm Bendow as Der Verdrießliche
 Franz-Otto Krüger as Der Sehnsüchtige
 Walter Gross
 Ewald Wenck
 Knut Hartwig
 Albert Venohr as
 Eva Maria Scholz
 Günther Lobe
 Horst Gentzen
 Ingeborg Krebs
 Erich Dunskus
 Lili Schoenborn-Anspach
 Toni Tetzlaff
 Hilde Sonntag
 Antonie Jaeckel
 Else Ehser
 Max Paetz

References

Bibliography
 Karl, Lars & Skopal, Pavel. Cinema in Service of the State: Perspectives on Film Culture in the GDR and Czechoslovakia, 1945–1960. Berghahn Books, 2015.

External links
 

1947 films
1940s German-language films
Films directed by Hans Deppe
German black-and-white films
German comedy films
1947 comedy films
Films set in Berlin
Films shot in Berlin
1940s German films
Films shot at Johannisthal Studios